Filadélfia, Tocantins is a municipality in the state of Tocantins in the Northern region of Brazil.

The municipality holds the Tocantins Fossil Trees Natural Monument, which preserves one of the largest collections of fossilized Permian trees in the world.

See also
List of municipalities in Tocantins

References

Municipalities in Tocantins